Deep technology (deep tech) or hard tech is a classification of organization, or more typically startup company, with the expressed objective of providing technology solutions based on substantial scientific or engineering challenges.  They present challenges requiring lengthy research and development, and large capital investment before successful commercialization.  Their primary risk is technical risk, while market risk is often significantly lower due to the clear potential value of the solution to society.  The underlying scientific or engineering problems being solved by deep tech and hard tech companies generate valuable intellectual property and are hard to reproduce.

Definition 

The term deep tech has been present for decades, representing R&D divisions at major defense and telecommunications corporations such as Raytheon Technologies, Lockheed Martin's Skunk Works, and Bell Labs, to the more modern definition which increasingly includes companies found in the venture capital ecosystem. The word doesn't refer to innovation itself, but to a category of startup companies that develop new products based “on scientific discovery or meaningful engineering innovation”.

According to year 2019 research by the Boston Consulting Group and Hello Tomorrow, a French nonprofit that supports deep technology, the most prominent deep tech fields included advanced materials, advanced manufacturing, artificial intelligence, biotechnology, blockchain, robotics, photonics, electronics, and quantum computing. Global private investment in those fields increased more than 20% a year from 2015, and reached almost $18 billion in 2018. Possible fields for deep tech application include agriculture, life sciences, chemistry, aerospace and green energy.
In business context, deep tech has three key attributes: potential for impact, a long time to reach market-ready maturity, and substantial requirement for capital.

 Deep tech innovations are often radical and may create new markets or disrupt existing ones. Deep tech companies often address big societal and environmental challenges and have potential to impact everyday life. Silicon chips are an example of innovation that enabled calculation at previously unimaginable speed and scale. 
 The time required to move from basic science to applicable technology in deep tech exceed the development time of startups based on widely available technology ("shallow tech" such as mobile apps, websites, and e-commerce services). For instance, the development of technology behind artificial intelligence took decades, and now AI companies are rapidly developing in many fields. According to Hello Tomorrow, as of 2019 it took an average of four years to reach market in biotech and 2.4 years in blockchain.
 The demand for huge early-stage funding for R&D and prototype development and lengthy life cycle of deep tech startups forces them to abandon the established funding progression from friends and family to angel and seed money, series A and subsequent rounds leading to trade sale or IPO.

History 

The funding for deep tech companies has increased over the years. According to Boston Consulting Group, the total investments in deep tech companies increased from $1.7 billion to $7.9 billion from 2011 through 2016. Investment activities are concentrated in the United States and China that totaled for about 81% of global private investments in deep tech from 2015 through 2018 with approximately $32.8 billion and $14.6 billion invested in each country, respectively. China acts as the main driver in deep tech investments with funding increasing 80% each year over that period compared to 10% each year in the US. European countries are also active in deep tech investing. According to the Financial Times, in 2017 the total funding towards deep tech companies reached around €3 billion across 600 deals.

Corporations such as Google, Facebook, Amazon, IBM and Apple show increased interest towards deep tech applications in AI, virtual reality, drones, self-driving cars. Business accelerators are also shifting focus from digital startups towards deep tech ventures. In 2016 Y Combinator's batch there were 32 deep tech startups including 9 in biotech, 4 in drones and 3 in advanced hardware. The Eindhoven-based startup accelerator HighTechXL exclusively focuses on deep tech ventures.

See also
 Venture capital
 Intermediate technology – sometimes used to mean technology between low and high technology
 HighTechXL

References

Entrepreneurship
Types of business entity